Emile Erasmus (born 3 April 1992) is a South African male track and field sprinter who specialises in the 100 metres. He holds a personal best of 10.01 seconds for the distance.

His first international medal came at the 2011 African Junior Athletics Championships, where he won a bronze in the 100 m, while his compatriot Gideon Trotter took gold. He undertook a degree in civil engineering at the University of Pretoria and continued to train under coach Frans van Rooyen.

Erasmus improved his 100 m best to 10.23 seconds in the 2014 season, placing third at the South African Athletics Championships. He repeated that feat at the 2015 and 2016 national championships, earning him a place in the national team for the 2016 African Championships in Athletics. Leading off the 4 × 100 metres relay team with Wayde van Niekerk, Tlotliso Leotlela, and Akani Simbine, the quartet took the gold medal. He made an individual breakthrough in the 2017 season with a new 100 m best of 10.08 seconds in his native Pretoria. He spent June and July competing in European meetings that year.

He was selected to compete at the 2018 IAAF World Indoor Championships, but had to withdraw due to an Achilles tendon issue. Erasmus helped set a South African record of 38.24 seconds in the relay at the 2018 Commonwealth Games, taking the silver medals alongside Henricho Bruintjies, Anaso Jobodwana and Akani Simbine (Simbine and Bruintjies had previously completed a 1–2 individually).

International competitions

1: Did not start in the semifinals

References

External links

1992 births
Living people
Sportspeople from Pretoria
South African male sprinters
Commonwealth Games silver medallists for South Africa
Commonwealth Games medallists in athletics
Athletes (track and field) at the 2018 Commonwealth Games
20th-century South African people
21st-century South African people
Medallists at the 2018 Commonwealth Games